Bösingen may refer to:

Bösingen, Baden-Württemberg, Germany
Bösingen, a former municipality, now part of Pfalzgrafenweiler, Baden-Württemberg, Germany
Bösingen, Switzerland

See also
Büsingen am Hochrhein, a German municipality in the south of Baden-Württemberg, an exclave within Switzerland